Sauga is a small borough in Pärnu County, southwestern Estonia in Tori Parish. Between 1992 and 2017 (until the administrative reform of Estonian local governments), the town was the administrative center of Sauga Parish.

See also
Sauga River

References

External links
Sauga Parish 

Boroughs and small boroughs in Estonia
Kreis Pernau